Francisco Pinto Manteigueiro (24 September 1933 – 9 November 2011) was a Portuguese football player who played as a midfielder for Sporting da Covilhã.

Manteigueiro was part of the 1956–57 Sporting da Covilhã side who reached the 1957 Taça de Portugal final.

See also
 List of one-club men

References

External links
 

1933 births
2011 deaths
People from Covilhã
Portuguese footballers
Association football midfielders
Primeira Liga players
Segunda Divisão players
S.C. Covilhã players
Portuguese football managers
S.C. Covilhã managers
Sportspeople from Castelo Branco District